Carole Babala (born 14 June 1989) is a team handball player from the Democratic Republic of the Congo. She plays for the club Alfortville, and on the DR Congo national team. She represented DR Congo at the 2013 World Women's Handball Championship in Serbia, where DR Congo placed 20th.

References

1989 births
Living people
Democratic Republic of the Congo female handball players
Democratic Republic of the Congo expatriates in France
21st-century Democratic Republic of the Congo people